The 12823 / 12824 Chhattisgarh Sampark Kranti Express is an India Superfast express train belonging to Indian Railways that runs between  and  in India, and is also called the king of South East Central Railway. It operates as train number 12823 from Durg to Hazrat Nizamuddin and as train number 12824 in the reverse direction.

Coaches

The 12823/12824 Chhattisgarh Sampark Kranti Superfast Express presently has 1 AC 1st Class cum AC 2 tier, 2 AC 2 tier, 1 AC 2 cum AC 3 tier, 4 AC 3 tier, 10 Sleeper class, 6 General Unreserved coaches & 1 Pantry car. As with most train services in India, coach composition may be amended at the discretion of Indian Railways depending on demand. It is operating with LHB coach since 2017.

Service

The 12823 Chhattisgarh Sampark Kranti Superfast Express covers the distance of 1281 kilometres in 21 hours 05 mins (60.76 km/hr) & 1284 kilometres in 21 hours 45 mins as 12824 Chhattisgarh Sampark Kranti Superfast Express (59.03 km/hr). As the average speed of the train is more than 55 km/hr, its fare includes a Superfast surcharge.

Route & halts

Traction

Direction reversal

Schedule

12823 Chhattisgarh Sampark Kranti Superfast Express leaves Durg every Monday, Thursday, Saturday and reaches Hazrat Nizamuddin the next day.
12824 Chhattisgarh Sampark Kranti Superfast Express leaves Hazrat Nizamuddin every Sunday, Tuesday, Friday and reaches Durg the next day.

References 

Transport in Durg
Transport in Delhi
Rail transport in Uttar Pradesh
Rail transport in Madhya Pradesh
Rail transport in Chhattisgarh
Sampark Kranti Express trains
Rail transport in Delhi
Railway services introduced in 2005